Fjellsjøkampen is a top in Hurdal, Akershus, Norway. It is the highest point in Akershus.

See also
List of highest points of Norwegian counties

References

Hurdal
Mountains of Viken